Keat Hwa Chinese schools are a group of Chinese schools in Alor Setar, Kedah, Malaysia, consisting of three secondary and three primary schools.

Secondary schools
 Keat Hwa Secondary School
 Keat Hwa II Secondary School
 Keat Hwa High School

Primary schools
 Keat Hwa H Primary School
 Keat Hwa K Primary School
 Keat Hwa S Primary School

Chinese-language schools in Malaysia